This is a list of British television related events from 1982.

Events

January
1 January 
Associated Television (ATV) was restructured into Central Independent Television but still broadcasting in the Midlands. Television South (TVS) starts broadcasting to the South and South East of England, replacing Southern Television and Television South West (TSW) starts broadcasting to the South West, replacing Westward Television.
The Bluebell Hill transmitter in Kent is transferred from Thames/LWT to TVS, to increase the size of TVS's new South East sub-region and the Kendal transmitter, covering much of southern Cumbria, is transferred from Granada to Border.
Yorkshire Television extends its coverage on the Lancashire/Yorkshire border, when transmitters covering Todmorden and Walsden are transferred from the Granada region.
In London, the Friday handover hours for Thames and LWT is moved from 7pm to the earlier time of 5:15pm.
The network television premiere of Steven Spielberg's 1977 science-fiction epic Close Encounters of the Third Kind on ITV, starring Richard Dreyfuss, François Truffaut and Melinda Dillon.
The network television premiere of Stanley Kubrick's film 2001: A Space Odyssey which is aired as part of BBC1's New Year's Day lineup.
2 January 
 The US action series The Fall Guy makes its UK debut on ITV, starring Lee Majors. 
 The late night comedy show O.T.T. makes its debut on ITV, presented by Tiswas regulars  Chris Tarrant, Lenny Henry and Bob Carolgees, the adult-themed series only runs for 12 episodes. 
3 January – The final edition of The Generation Game to be presented by Larry Grayson is broadcast on BBC1. It is a compilation of highlights of the previous series. The show would return with Bruce Forsyth presenting again in 1990.
4 January – Peter Davison makes his first full appearance as the Fifth Doctor in the Doctor Who serial Castrovalva.
5 January – Let's Pretend, a television programme for preschoolers and the replacement programme for Pipkins, makes its debut on ITV.
8 January
The Post–World War II era set family drama series Shine on Harvey Moon makes its debut on ITV, starring Kenneth Cranham. 
Launch of London Weekend Television's Friday evening magazine programme The Six O'Clock Show. Until December 1987, it includes a fifteen minute news bulletin produced by Thames and is called Thames Weekend News.
January – John Birt replaces Michael Grade as Director of Programmes at London Weekend Television and makes major changes to output aimed at maximising audiences with some niche programming, such as arts and science, moving out of primetime to the schedule margins to make way form more entertainment shows at peak time.

February
3 February – ITV airs The network television premiere of John Carpenter's 1978 slasher film Halloween on ITV, starring Jamie Lee Curtis and Donald Pleasence.
February – The first ever 3D broadcast in the UK is shown by TVS. The programme includes excerpts of test footage shot by Philips in the Netherlands. Red/green 3D glasses were given away free with copies of TV Times, but the 3D sections of the programme are shown in monochrome.

March
2 March – The second TV adaptation of John Mortimer's play A Voyage Round My Father, produced by Thames for ITV airs with Laurence Olivier as Mortimer's blind barrister father, Alan Bates as the young Mortimer, Elizabeth Sellars as the mother and Jane Asher as Elizabeth as well as blind actor Esmond Knight as a sighted judge.
5 March – The BBC is given permission by the Government to start broadcasting television programmes on two satellite channels from early 1986. However, the channels are not launched.
 5 March – The network television premiere of the 1973 Clint Eastwood Dirty Harry sequel Magnum Force on ITV, six months before the BBC show the first Dirty Harry film.
 21 March – BBC1 show the 1976 science fiction film Logan's Run, starring Michael York and Jenny Agutter.
27 March – The final edition of the Saturday morning children's magazine show Multi-Coloured Swap Shop is broadcast on BBC1.
28 March – The network television premiere of the 1977 James Bond film, The Spy Who Loved Me on ITV, starring Roger Moore. The broadcast of the film is reportedly watched by 22 million viewers.
29 March – The US police drama Cagney & Lacey makes its UK debut on BBC1.

April
2 April – The Falklands War begins as Argentina invades the Falkland Islands. Both the BBC and ITV broadcast additional and extended news bulletins throughout the conflict.
3 April – The final edition of the children's Saturday morning series Tiswas is broadcast on ITV. It had been shown, albeit originally as a regional show made by ATV since 1974.
15 April – BBC2's start time moves to the later time of 5:10pm with transmissions beginning with a single Open University programme with regular programmes now beginning at 5:40pm. For the past six months, BBC2 had been starting its weekday broadcasts at the earlier time of 3:55pm.
16 April – Debut of the game show Odd One Out on BBC1, presented by Paul Daniels. 
17 April – The BBC launches its first Summer Saturday morning magazine show, Get Set. However, unlike its Winter counterpart, the Summer shows only air for the first half of the morning. This allows for an earlier start to  Grandstand to accommodate live test cricket and on the weeks that cricket is not being shown, a feature film is broadcast from around 11am until the start of Grandstand at 12:30pm.
24 April – The 27th Eurovision Song Contest is held in Harrogate, North Yorkshire. The contest is presented by Jan Leeming and won by Germany's Nicole with Ein bißchen Frieden.
26 April – The Satellite Channel launches. However, to be able to view the channel in the UK, a satellite dish approximately 10 feet (3 meters) wide is required due to the satellite on which the channel is broadcast. In 1984, it is renamed Sky Channel after it is purchased by Rupert Murdoch and in 1989 it is renamed Sky One alongside the launch of Sky's satellite television service.

May
1 May – The US soap opera Dynasty makes its UK debut on BBC1. 
4 May – The long-running chat show Wogan makes its debut on BBC1, presented by Terry Wogan. It would be shown thrice weekly from 1985 and would continue until July 1992.
9 May – BBC1 airs live coverage of the London Marathon for the first time. It had aired highlights of the event under the International Athletics strand the previous year.
26 May – The network television premiere of the 1978 horror film sequel Damien: Omen II on ITV, starring William Holden. 
28 May–2 June – The BBC and ITV provide extensive live coverage of Pope John Paul II's visit to the UK.

June
14 June – The Falklands War ends after Argentina surrenders.
17 June – The US musical high school drama Fame makes its UK debut on BBC1.
20 June – The BBC relaunches its Sunday morning programme for the Asian community which is called Asian Magazine.

July
11 July – The network television premiere of Ridley Scott's 1979 science-fiction horror film Alien on ITV, starring Sigourney Weaver, Tom Skerritt, John Hurt, Ian Holm, Yaphet Kotto and Harry Dean Stanton.
26 July – Alasdair Milne succeeds Ian Trethowan as Director-General of the BBC.

August
2 August – Test broadcasts commence for Channel 4 and S4C. These mainly consist of showing the IBA's testcard ETP-1 between 9am and 8pm.

September
4 September – Debut of The Late, Late Breakfast Show on BBC1, presented by Noel Edmonds. 
8 September – BBC1 airs the original 1971 Dirty Harry movie, starring Clint Eastwood.
19 September – Clive James on Television makes its debut on ITV in which Australian TV critic and journalist Clive James looks at bizarre television shows from around the world.  
20 September – The BBC Schools computer-generated ident launches.

October
2 October – The first edition of the Saturday morning children's show Saturday Superstore is broadcast on BBC1. It adopts a similar format to its predecessor, Multi-Coloured Swap Shop. 
3–9 October – As part of its coverage of the 1982 Commonwealth Games, the BBC airs a two-hour breakfast programme called Breakfast with Brisbane. It includes regular news summaries and is the first time the BBC has broadcast a scheduled news bulletin at breakfast and comes three months ahead of the launch of their own breakfast television programme Breakfast Time. Other coverage of the Games consists of highlights programmes aired at lunchtime and early evening.
6 October – BBC1 starts airing season 6 of the US drama series Dallas.
10 October – Alan Bleasdale's hard-hitting Liverpool-set drama Boys from the Blackstuff makes its debut on BBC2. Starring Bernard Hill as the downtrodden character Yosser Hughes. The final episode was shown on 7 November.
17 October – The network television premiere of Lord of the Flies on BBC2.
24 October – The network television premiere of George Lucas epic 1977 science-fiction blockbuster Star Wars: A New Hope on ITV, starring Mark Hamill, Harrison Ford and Carrie Fisher. At the time it was the most money ITV had spent on a single film ($4 million dollars) for three showings over seven years, however they go on to show Star Wars a total of five times (Oct '82, Sept '83, Dec '84, Jan '87 & Jan '88). The debut 1982 showing drew in an estimated audience of over 16.8 million viewers.
31 October – Programmes in Welsh are broadcast both on the BBC and HTV for the final time.

November
 1 November – S4C, the first Welsh language TV service is launched.
 2 November – Channel 4 starts broadcasting at 4:45pm.
The first programme shown is the game show Countdown, presented by Richard Whiteley which barring the news is the only programme from the launch night that is still running to this day. 
The first ever episode of the soap opera Brookside is broadcast. It was shown on Tuesdays and Wednesdays at 8pm and would run until 2003. 
Also debuting that evening were the comedies The Paul Hogan Show and The Comic Strip Presents... Five Go Mad in Dorset which featured early TV appearances from Dawn French and Jennifer Saunders. 
3 November – Debut of the nostalgic coming-of-age film P'tang, Yang, Kipperbang on Channel 4, produced by David Puttnam and directed by Michael Apted as part of the First Love series.
5 November – Debut of Channel 4's innovative music show The Tube, presented by Jools Holland and Paula Yates.
7 November – Coverage of American football is first shown on Channel 4 at 5:30pm, beginning the channel's association with the sport. The programme is initially presented by Nicky Horne and Miles Aiken, but due to an NFL players strike over pay negotiation rules, it is forced to show matches played earlier in the season. In spite of this and because of the British viewing public's limited knowledge of American football, coverage of the sport proves to be popular. The players have ended their action by January 1983, enabling Channel 4 to air live coverage of that year's Super Bowl.
7–28 November – The London Weekend Television epic production The Life and Adventures of Nicholas Nickleby is aired by Channel 4 over its first four Sunday evenings on the air.
8 November – Channel 4 begins airing basketball coverage, presented by Simon Reed and Miles Aiken. Each week sees coverage of a match from Division One of the National Basketball League with highlights of the first half of the game and live coverage of the second half. The first match to be shown is a game between the Birmingham Bullets and Crystal Palace.
9 November – The first episode of the anarchic sitcom The Young Ones is broadcast on BBC2, starring Rik Mayall, Ade Edmondson, Nigel Planer, Christopher Ryan and Alexei Sayle. 
14 November – The viewer complaints programme Right to Reply is first broadcast on Channel 4.
16 November – A dispute over new technology forces Border to close for around a month.
20 November – BBC1 begin showing the 5-part historical Japanese-set drama Shōgun, starring Richard Chamberlain.

December
2 December – 10.2 million viewers saw a classic comedy scene from the Only Fools and Horses episode A Touch of Glass in which the Trotters accidentally smash a priceless chandelier.
23 December – Service Information is broadcast on BBC2 for the final time.
25 December – The network television premiere of Walt Disney's 1979 Sci-fi film The Black Hole on ITV. TSW choose to opt out and show a different movie instead.
26 December – Debut of Raymond Briggs The Snowman on Channel 4. The acclaimed children's animated short film would go on to be repeated annually each Christmas.
27 December 
The network television premiere of the 1979 James Bond film Moonraker on ITV, starring Roger Moore.
Channel 4 airs its first theme night, Fifties to the Fore. The evening includes episodes of ABC and ATV shows such as Armchair Theatre and Oh Boy!.
28 December 
The network television premiere of the 1978 hit musical Grease on BBC1, starring John Travolta and Olivia Newton-John.
The network television premiere of the 1977 comedy Smokey and the Bandit on ITV, starring Burt Reynolds, Sally Field and Jackie Gleason.
December – ITV conducts a national 3D experiment with red/blue glasses allowing colour 3D to be shown for the first time. The programme, an episode of the weekly science magazine The Real World produced by TVS is shown on a weekday evening and repeated that weekend on Sunday afternoon, followed by a rare showing of the Western Fort Ti, starring George Montgomery and Joan Vohs.

Debuts

BBC1
 3 January – Gulliver in Lilliput (1982)
 4 January – Police (1982)
 6 January – The Story of the Treasure Seekers (1982)
 7 January – Huckleberry Finn and His Friends (1979-1980)
 8 January – Fame is the Spur (1982)
 10 January – King's Royal (1982–1983)
 28 January – Goodbye, Mr Kent (1982)
 31 January – Stalky & Co. (1982)
 16 February – Legacy of Murder (1982)
 1 March – Alexa (1982)
 25 March – Love Is Old, Love Is New (1982)
 29 March – Cagney & Lacey (1981–1988)
 11 April – Badger by Owl-Light (1982)
 13 April – Play for Tomorrow (1982)
 16 April – Odd One Out (1982–1985)
 22 April – Bird of Prey (1982)
 1 May – Dynasty (1981–1989)
 4 May – Wogan (1982–1992)
 5 May – Secrets (1982)
 1 June – Take Two (1982–1996)
 17 June – Fame (1982–1987)
 17 August – An Inspector Calls (1982)
 4 September – The Late, Late Breakfast Show (1982–1986)
 5 September – Cousin Phillis (1982)
 9 September – Claire (1982)
 28 September – With My Little Eye (1982)
 29 September – The Jockey School (1982)
 2 October 
 Carrott's Lib (1982–1983)
 Saturday Superstore (1982–1987)
 3 October – The Hound of the Baskervilles (1982)
 19 October – Squadron (1982)
 31 October – Beau Geste (1982)
 10 November – Billy Boy (1982)
 17 November – Break Point (1982)
 20 November – Shōgun (1980)
 30 December 
 'Allo 'Allo! (1982–1992)
 The Barretts of Wimpole Street (1982)
 Then Churchill Said to Me  (made but not screened until 1993)
 31 December – Ghost in the Water (1982)

BBC2
 7 January – Ennal's Point (1982)
 13 January – The Bell (1982)
 25 January – West Country Tales (1982–1983)
 10 February – Nancy Astor (1982)
 18 February – County Hall (1982)
 5 March – Dear Heart (1982)
 14 April – The Woman in White (1982)
 19 May – Frost in May (1982)
 6 July – Food and Drink (1982–2002)
 14 July – Cloud Howe (1982)
 2 August – Jane (1982)
 1 September – Timewatch (1982–present)
 20 September 
 Smiley's People (1982)
 There's a Lot of It About (1982)
 21 September – Take Three Women (1982)
 8 October – L for Lester (1982)
 10 October – Boys from the Blackstuff (1982)
 17 October – Wagner's Ring (1982)
1 November – The Further Adventures of Lucky Jim (1982)
 4 November – Eureka (1982–1986)
 9 November – The Young Ones (1982–1984)
 10 November – The Barchester Chronicles (1982)
 12 November – Objects of Affection (1982)
 14 December – Another Flip for Dominick (1982)
 26 December – Spider's Web (1982)
 29 December – East Lynne (1982)

ITV
 1 January – Central News (1982–present)
 2 January 
No. 73 (1982–1988)
O.T.T. (1982)
The Fall Guy (1981–1986)
 3 January – Airline (1982)
 4 January 
 Don't Rock the Boat (1982–1983)
  Let's Pretend (1982–1988)
 Let There Be Love (1982–1983)
 5 January 
Emu's World (1982–1984)
CBTV (1982–1985)
 8 January – Shine on Harvey Moon (1982–1985, 1995)
 12 January – Muck and Brass (1982)
 22 January – Hill Street Blues (1981–1987)
 12 February – We'll Meet Again (1982)
 15 February – Dead Ernest (1982)
 16 February – On Safari (1982–1985)
 18 February – Falcon Crest (1981–1990)
 26 February – The Haunting of Cassie Palmer (1982)
 28 February – Father Charlie  (1982)
 1 March – Murphy's Mob (1982–1985)
 2 March – A Voyage Round My Father (1985)
 14 March – Whoops Apocalypse (1982)
 29 March – 3-2-1 Contact (1980–1988)
 31 March – All for Love (1982–1983) (Anthology)
 4 April – A Kind of Loving (1982)
 6 April – The Brack Report (1982)
 13 April – Horace (1982)
 14 April – I Remember Nelson (1982)
 16 April – The Bounder (1982–1983)
 18 April – Jangles (1982)
 19 April – Union Castle (1982)
 28 May – On the Line (1982)
 9 June – Andy Robson (1982–1983)
 10 June – There's Nothing to Worry About!  (1982)
 14 June – The World Cup: A Captain's Tale (1982)
 30 June – Something in Disguise (1982)
 6 July – Pullover (1982)
 9 July – Rep (1982)
 12 July – A.J. Wentworth, B.A. (1982)
 25 July – All for Love (1982–1983)
 26 July – Ragdolly Anna (1982–1987)
 2 August – Comic Roots  (1982–1983)
 6 August – Third Time Lucky (1982)
 1 September – Radio Phoenix (1982)
 7 September – The Agatha Christie Hour (1982)
 13 September 
 Hold Tight! (1982–1987)
 Tom, Dick and Harriet (1982)
 Living in Styal (1982) (prison documentary)
 19 September – Clive James on Television (1982–1988)
 23 September – Wales This Week (1982–present)
 26 September – Ivanhoe (1982)
 25 October 
Foxy Lady (1982–1984)
Harry's Game (1982)
 27 October – A Country Practice (1981–1994)
 30 October – The Saturday Show (1982–1984)
 31 October – Young Sherlock: The Mystery of the Manor House (1982)
 3 November – The Cut Price Comedy Show (1982–1983)
 7 November – Sunday Sunday (1982–1990)
 9 November – S.W.A.L.K. (1982)
 10 November – Nobody's Hero (1982)
 13 November – Saturday Night Thriller (1982)
 28 December – Anyone for Denis? (1982)
 Unknown – Fables of the Green Forest (1982)

Channel 4
 2 November 
Countdown (1982–present)
Brookside (1982–2003)
Channel 4 News (1982–present)
The Comic Strip Presents (1982–2005)
Lucy-May of the Southern Rainbow (1982)
The Paul Hogan Show (1973–1984)
 3 November – P'tang, Yang, Kipperbang (1982)
 5 November – The Tube (1982–1987)
 7 November – The Life and Adventures of Nicholas Nickleby (1982)
 14 November – Right to Reply (1982–2001)
 26 December – The Snowman (1982)
 28 December – Treasure Hunt (1982–1989)
 Unknown – Black on Black (1982–1985)

S4C
 1 November 
 SuperTed (1982–1986)
 Newyddion (1982–present)
 3 November – Y Byd ar Bedwar (1982–present)
 4 November – Joni Jones (1982)
 5 November – Anturiaethau Syr Wynff a Plwmsan (1982–1989)
 11 November – Noson Lawen (1982–present)

New channels

Television shows

Changes of network affiliation

Continuing television shows

1920s
BBC Wimbledon (1927–1939, 1946–2019, 2021–present)

1930s
The Boat Race (1938–1939, 1946–2019)
BBC Cricket (1939, 1946–1999, 2020–2024)

1940s
Come Dancing (1949–1998)

1950s
The Good Old Days (1953–1983)
Panorama (1953–present)
Crackerjack (1955–1984, 2020–present)
What the Papers Say (1956–2008)
The Sky at Night (1957–present)
Blue Peter (1958–present)
Grandstand (1958–2007)

1960s
Coronation Street (1960–present)
Songs of Praise (1961–present)
Animal Magic (1962–1983)
Doctor Who (1963–1989, 1996, 2005–present)
World in Action (1963–1998)
Top of the Pops (1964–2006)
Match of the Day (1964–present)
Crossroads (1964–1988, 2001–2003)
Play School (1964–1988)
Mr. and Mrs. (1965–1999) 
World of Sport (1965–1985)
Jackanory (1965–1996, 2006)
Sportsnight (1965–1997) 
Call My Bluff (1965–2005)
The Money Programme (1966–2010)
The Big Match (1968–2002)
Nationwide (1969–1983)
Screen Test (1969–1984)

1970s
The Old Grey Whistle Test (1971–1987)
The Two Ronnies (1971–1987, 1991, 1996, 2005)
Crown Court (1972–1984)
Pebble Mill at One (1972–1986)
Rainbow (1972–1992, 1994–1997)
Emmerdale (1972–present)
Newsround (1972–present)
Weekend World (1972–1988)
We Are the Champions (1973–1987)
Last of the Summer Wine (1973–2010)
That's Life! (1973–1994)
Wish You Were Here...? (1974–2003)
Arena (1975–present)
Jim'll Fix It (1975–1994)
Rentaghost (1976–1984)
One Man and His Dog (1976–present)
Open All Hours (1976, 1981–1982, 1985)
The Professionals (1977–1983)
Butterflies (1978–1983, 2000)
3-2-1 (1978–1988)
Grange Hill (1978–2008)
Ski Sunday (1978–present)
Terry and June (1979–1987)
The Book Tower (1979–1989)
Blankety Blank (1979–1990, 1997–2002)
The Paul Daniels Magic Show (1979–1994)
Antiques Roadshow (1979–present)
Question Time (1979–present)

1980s
Play Your Cards Right (1980–1987, 1994–1999, 2002–2003) 
Family Fortunes (1980–2002, 2006–2015, 2020–present) 
The Gentle Touch (1980–1984)
Juliet Bravo (1980–1985)
Cockleshell Bay (1980–1986)
Children in Need (1980–present)
The Gaffer (1981–1983)
A Fine Romance (1981–1984)
Punchlines (1981–1984)
Finders Keepers (1981–1985) 
Freetime (1981–1985)
Game for a Laugh (1981–1985)
Tenko (1981–1985)
That's My Boy (1981–1986)
Razzamatazz (1981–1987)
Bergerac (1981–1991)
BBC News After Noon (1981–1986)
Sorry! (1981–1988)

Ending this year
 Unknown 
Boys from the Blackstuff (1982)
Harry's Game (1982)
Noggin the Nog (1959–1970, 1979–1982)
O.T.T. (1982)
 1 January – Clapperboard (1972–1982)
 13 February – The Goodies (1970–1982)
 6 March – Dick Turpin (1979–1982)
 8 March – Not the Nine O'Clock News (1979–1982)
 27 March – Multi-Coloured Swap Shop (1976–1982)
 2 April – Friday Night, Saturday Morning (1979–1982)
 3 April – Tiswas (1974–1982)
 10 April – Parkinson (1971–1982, 1998–2007)
 25 April – Open All Hours (1976, 1981–1982, 1985, 2013)
 30 July – It's a Knockout (1966–1982, 1999–2001) 
 31 August – Sapphire & Steel (1979–1982)
 8 September – Into the Labyrinth (1980–1982)
 15 October – Something Else (1978–1982)
 20 October – Strangers (1978–1982)
 16 December – Only When I Laugh (1979–1982)
 27 December – Sorry! (1981–1982, 1985–1988)Lucy-May of the Southern Rainbow (1982)

Births

 3 January – Amanda Robbins, model
 20 January – Joe Swash, actor
 9 March – Paul 'Des' Ballard, television presenter
 22 March – Pete Bennett, reality show contestant
 2 April – Jenny Ryan, game show contestant and Chaser on The Chase
 24 April – Laura Hamilton, television presenter
 28 April – Nikki Grahame, model, dancer and television personality (died 2021) 
 7 June – Amy Nuttall, actress and opera singer
 13 June – Davood Ghadami, actor
 22 September – Billie Piper, singer and actress
 28 October – Matt Smith, actor
 29 November – Imogen Thomas, reality show contestant
 21 December – Tom Payne, soap actor

Deaths

See also
 1982 in British music
 1982 in British radio
 1982 in the United Kingdom
 List of British films of 1982

References